Christophe de Ponfilly (1951–2006) was a French journalist, film director, cinematographer, and screenwriter. He was married to Florence Dauchez .

Awards
 Prix Albert-Londres 1985 (for Les Combattants de l'Insolence)
 Special jury prize, festival du scoop et du journalisme d’Angers (for Monsieur le Rabin - 1999)
 Special jury prize, 14th global television festival, Japan. (for Massoud, l'afghan - 2000)
 Planet Prize, Special jury prize, et Prize from the youth Jury, F.I.G.R.A.(for Massoud, l'afghan - 1998)
 Best documentary, Festival dei Popoli (Florence) (Massoud, l'afghan - 1998)
 Grand Prize, festival Montagne et Aventure d'Autrans (Massoud l'afghan - 2001)
 C.F.A. prize, "best documentary of the year" (Les Plumes font leur CirQue)
 Planète Câble prize, and special jury prize,  F.I.G.R.A. (Naître, des histoires banales mais belles - 1994)
 UNESCO prize, International film and art festival, 1994 (Do ré mi fa sol la si do, les Kummer)
 Prix spécial du jury à La Nuit des Yeux d’Or de Reuil Malmaison 1994 (Kaboul au bout du monde)
 UNESCO prize, Festival of African programs, Nairobi 1994 (Télé-Radio-Magie)
 Best documentary, 1992 at Rencontres Européennes de Télévision de Reims (W Street - 1992)
 Unda prize, Monte-Carlo International Festival (A cœur, à corps, à cris - 1992)
 Grand prize,  du Festival international de journalisme d'Angers 1990 (Poussières de Guerre)
 Aigle d'or du Festival international d'histoire de Rueil-Malmaison 1990 (Poussières de Guerre)
 Mention au Festival Europa 1991 (Autofolies)
 Prix du meilleur film humanitaire 1987, festival du grand reportage de La Ciotat (Les damnés de l'URSS et Soldats perdus)
 Prix international ONDAS 1983 (Une vallée contre un empire)

See also
Albert Films
Frédéric Laffont
Interscoop, The Interscoop Press Agency est. 1982

External links
 

1951 births
2006 suicides
French documentary filmmakers
French film directors
French film producers
French male screenwriters
20th-century French screenwriters
Writers from Paris
French war correspondents
20th-century French male writers
French male non-fiction writers
Suicides by firearm in France
2006 deaths